Eoophyla brunnealis is a moth in the family Crambidae. It was described by George Hampson in 1897. It is found on New Guinea.

References

Eoophyla
Moths described in 1897